George McKenzie may refer to:

 George McKenzie (boxer) (1901–1941), Scottish boxer
 George McKenzie (footballer, born 1908) (1908–1974), Scottish amateur footballer
 George McKenzie (Irish footballer) (died 2006), Republic of Ireland soccer international

See also 
 George MacKenzie (disambiguation)